Pheidon (Greek: Φείδων) was an Argive ruler during the 7th century BCE and 10th in line to Temenus. He was arguably Argos's most ambitious and successful ruler during the 7th century BCE. There is a possibility that there were in fact two different Pheidons who were both rulers of Argos.

Life and reign
Pheidon seems to have been a descendant of Heracles through Temenus, something he seems to have shared with the rulers of Lakedaimon as they were descended from both Procles and Eurysthenes respectively. These mythical ancestors conquered the Peloponessus and split the land among themselves.

According to tradition, he flourished during the first half of the 7th century BCE. During this, the Argive monarchy was nominal with almost no genuine power. Pheidon seized the throne from the reigning aristocracy with the support of the lower classes. He is considered in the tradition of other tyrants, like Gyges of Lydia, as an outsider to the ruling caste in some ways even though a fragment of the Parian Chronicle confirms him to have been a noble and places him as eleventh in line from Heracles. Scholarship has called Pheidon's 'reign' a tyranny based on Aristotle's definition in Politics. He was a vigorous and energetic ruler and greatly increased the power of Argos,. he rounded up the broken parts of Temenus's entire inheritance, and during his reign several other tyrants emerged through the city-states, such as Cypselus of Corinth and Theagenes of Megara, possibly inspired by him.

In an effort to debilitate Corinth, he asked the Corinthians to send him 1,000 of their picked youths under a leader called Dexander, ostensibly to aid him in war, his real intention being to put them to death so that Argos may rise in power,. but the plot was revealed by a Corinthian named Habron. Pheidon attempted to search for the individual but he had fled to Corinth, settling in Melissus.

During his probable reign, the Battle of Hysiae (in 669/8 BCE) was fought in which the Argives defeated the Spartans. This is also about the time period that hoplite warfare was becoming current and the development of the Aspis, particularly in Argos. It is probable that he was the originator of hoplite phalanx. It is also probable that he used this formation against the Spartans within the walls of Hysiae. This formation changed the course of Greek history, as the Spartans later adopted it and became the dominant military force in Greece. Pheidon  then would have been the ruler of Argos during the Second Messenian War, in which Argos supported Messenia to revolt from Sparta's dominance. Throughout his reign, it seems that Argos was in conflict with not only the Spartans, but the Corinthians, as well as the Sicyonians. This may show that he had expansionist policies and achieved some success. It is said that Pheidon held  It is possible, though not certain, that the "successful war" that Cleisthenes of Sicyon waged on Argos may have been against his son Lacidamos or grandson, Meltas.

Aristotle, in "Politics", claims that he made changes to land reforms “family plots and the number of citizens should be kept equal, even if the citizens had all started with plots of unequal size.” He also claims that Pheidon started off as a king (basileus) and ended up a tyrant (tyrannos). The balance between these two types of ancient 'kingship' seem to have vague boundaries.

In the list of the suitors of Agariste, daughter of Cleisthenes of Sicyon, given by Herodotus, there occurs the name of Leokedes or Lakedas, son of Pheidon of Argos. According to this, Pheidon must have flourished during the early part of the 6th century BCE. It has therefore been assumed that Herodotus confused two Pheidons, both kings of Argos. The suggested substitution in the text of Pausanias of the 28th for the 8th Olympiad (i.e. 668 instead of 748) would not bring it into agreement with Herodotus, for even then, Pheidon's son could not have been a suitor in 570 for the hand of Agariste.

But the story of Agariste's chronology is questionable. In this story, Herodotus tells about the marriage contest that took place, where the suitor Hippocleides engages in an immodest dance, and thus loses the bride. But this story of Hippocleides may only be a Greek version of the Indian story (jataka) of the "shameless dancing peacock". Thus, the personages may have been introduced regardless of chronology. According to Leslie Kurke, while the marriage of Agariste was indeed historical, the story in question was added and embellished by Herodotus, and modelled on the Indian tale.

On the whole, modern authorities assign Pheidon to the first half of the 7th century. According to Konrad H. Kinzl, Pheidon can be dated in the middle of the sixth century BCE. Pheidon is said to have died in a factional fight in Corinth. which was under the rule of Cypselus, where the monarchy had recently been overthrown. It is unknown with which faction he had sided.

Weights and measures
Herodotus further states that Pheidon established a system of weights and measures throughout the Peloponnesus, to which Ephorus and the Parian Chronicle add that he was the first to coin silver money, and that his mint was at Aegina. But according to the better authority of Herodotus (i. 94) and Xenophanes of Colophon, the Lydians were the first coiners of money at the beginning of the 7th century, and, further, the oldest known Aeginetan coins are of later date than Pheidon. Hence, unless a later Pheidon is assumed, the statement of Ephorus must be considered unhistorical. No such difficulty occurs in regard to the weights and measures; it is generally agreed that a system was already in existence in the time of Pheidon, into which he introduced certain changes.

A passage in the Aristotelian Constitution of Athens states that the measures used before the Solonian period of reform were called Pheidonian.

Notes

References

7th-century BC Greek people
Kings of Argos